Adel al-Zubeidi was a defense attorney during the Hussein Trials on the legal team representing Taha Yassin Ramadan.

He was killed on November 8, 2005, by three gunmen driving in either an Opel or a "government vehicle" outside Adil, a Sunni neighbourhood of Baghdad. He was traveling with Thamer Hamoud al-Khuzaie, another lawyer associated with the trials who was wounded in the attack. The day before, he had predicted he would be murdered.

He was the second of Saddam's attorneys to be killed by unknown forces, his death coming less than three weeks after Saadoun Sughaiyer al-Janabi was also killed.

See also
 Saadoun Sughaiyer al-Janabi, a defense attorney for Awad Hamed al-Bandar, murdered in 2005
 Khamis al-Obeidi, a defense attorney for Saddam Hussein, murdered in 2006

References
"Saddam's lawyer predicted his death". (Nov. 10, 2005). New Straits Times, p. 34.

Year of birth missing
2005 deaths
20th-century Iraqi lawyers
Deaths by firearm in Iraq
Assassinated Iraqi people
Iraqi terrorism victims
Terrorism deaths in Iraq
2005 murders in Iraq
21st-century Iraqi lawyers